Angèle Jacq (1937 – April 12, 2021) was Breton writer. Born in Landudal, she was a farmer who became a bank employee. From 1995, she began writing historical novels located in Brittany.

She also was a committed advocate of the Breton language, of which she was a speaker. She took a stand against the destruction of the collective memory of the Bretons and for a popular education detached from the State.

Works 
Historical novels:
1995: Les braises de la liberté, Éditions France-Empire. Reprinted in 2010 by Coop Breizh, this novel has a sequel, Tinaig, also published by Coop Breizh
1997: Légendes de Bretagne, France-Empire
1999: Le voyage de Jabel, Edilarge, Cezam Prix Littéraire Inter CE in 2000
2002: Ma langue au chat, Le Palémon
 In the series Les hommes libres :
2003: Volume 1: Ils n'avaient que leurs mains, Le Palémon
2005: Volume 2: Un brassard et des sabots, Le Palémon
2007: Volume 3: Liberté Frankiz Fahafana, Le Palémon

References

External links 
 Angèle Jacq on les Éditions du Palémon, in Quimper
 Biographie on DiwanParis
 Angèle Jacq on Babelio
 Angèle Jacq : Nous ferons tout ce qu'il faut pour être un peuple à jamais on Agence Bretagne Presse

1937 births
2021 deaths
20th-century French women writers
20th-century French non-fiction writers
People from Finistère
Writers from Brittany